Taurometopa pulverea is a species of moth in the family Crambidae. It is found in Argentina.

References

Moths described in 1917
Odontiinae
Taxa named by George Hampson